Funatsu Dam  is a gravity dam located in Kumamoto Prefecture in Japan. The dam is used for power production. The catchment area of the dam is 377.8 km2. The dam impounds about 30  ha of land when full and can store 2495 thousand cubic meters of water. The construction of the dam was started on 1967 and completed in 1970.

See also
List of dams in Japan

References

Dams in Kumamoto Prefecture